The 30th running of the Emakumeen Euskal Bira was held from 17 to 21 May 2017. Raced over five stages in the Basque Country, Spain, it had a total distance of 37 km. South African rider Ashleigh Moolman won the event after she won the final stage to Errenteria.

Teams
Twenty-one teams participated in the race:

Route

Results

Stage 1

Stage 2

Stage 3

Stage 4

Stage 5

See also
 2017 in women's road cycling

References

2017
2017 UCI Women's World Tour
2017 in Spanish road cycling